A limited radiology technician perform x-rays of patients and deliver the images to requester. They make no diagnosis but still work closely with patients, explaining procedures, operating the X-ray and other associated equipment. Technical aspects include positioning patients for X-rays, determining appropriate angle and height of X-ray equipment, and calculating radiation dosages needed to create X-rays of the appropriate density, detail, and contrast, enabling the physician to make an accurate diagnosis.

References

Sources
Justin Paskett, Healthcare Education Consultant at the Center for Excellence in Higher Education.

Radiology
Technicians
Allied health professions